Prom Queen: Summer Heat is the mini-series spinoff from the web series Prom Queen. Like Prom Queen, the show was produced by former Walt Disney CEO Michael Eisner's production company Vuguru and the returning internet series production company Big Fantastic, the creators of SamHas7Friends.

Plot
Following the events of the web-series Prom Queen, the characters venture south to Mexico for a summer vacation, but find themselves unable to escape the mysteries that had haunted their high school lives.

Cast
Sean Hankinson as Ben
Katy Stoll as Sadie
David Loren as Chad
Laura Howard as Danica
Alexandra French as Nikki
Jake Shideler as Josh
Angela Arimento as Marisol

References
 TV Week article

External links
 promqueen.tv - official site
 
 Official Prom Queen account on MySpace
 Prom Queen profile on imeem

American drama web series